Asthena tchratchraria is a moth in the family Geometridae first described by Charles Oberthür in 1893. It is found in Myanmar and China.

References

Moths described in 1893
Asthena
Moths of Asia